David McAlister (2 April 1951 – 25 June 2015) was an English actor on television, in musicals, on stage and in film, known for his voice-over work.

Personal life
McAlister was born on 2 April 1951 in Worthing, Sussex and died on 25 June 2015 of cancer. He was married with two children (a girl and a boy) living with his family in Surrey.

Career
McAlister was best known for his portrayal of Daddy Warbucks in the stage production of the American musical Annie. It was in 2006 that he first got the part of Daddy Warbucks in Annie The Musical. He returned to the part in 2009 for its UK Tour, and then again between 2010–2011, and in 2012 went with it to Hong Kong and Singapore. He died in 2015.

Theatres and musicals
McAlister also starred as Horace Vandergelder in the 2008 stage revival of Hello, Dolly!! For 5 years he played Dennis Richardson in Channel 4’s Hollyoaks (British Soap Nomination as Best Villain). He was active in various areas of the entertainment industry such as Opera at Covent Garden (Pazzariello in Franco Zeffirelli’s production of Pagliacci), TV comedy (Harry Enfield & Chums), Radio Drama (The Archers) and classic TV (Brideshead Revisited).

In musical theatre he was the original Harry in the National tour of Stephen Sondheim’s Company, whilst in London’s West End The Sound of Music (Palace Theatre) as 12-year-old Freidrich Von Trapp, Ernest Simpson in Always (Victoria Palace), A Month in the Country (Cambridge), Oh Kay! (Westminster), and Christian Brent in Peg (Phoenix) He also played Kurt Weill in Ken Russell’s Weill & Lenya and Noël Coward in Sheridan Morley’s Noel & Gertie. He spent a year as the lead in the West End production of The Mousetrap (St Martins), and starred in the Ivor Novello role in Kings Rhapsody (National tour) and created the role of Alan in the European premiere of the Maltby/Shire musical Baby. In 2005 he was flown to Doha to entertain The Emir Of Qatar as Leading Player in Aspire (a circus-style musical entertainment). He created the role of Sinclair Platt in Dreams from a Summerhouse (written and directed by Alan Ayckbourn) in Scarborough.

Television

Has appeared on television for over 50 years in shows such as: 
 The Golden Hour
 Red Cap
 Mike Bassett TV
 Doctor Who (in the serial The Stones of Blood)
 Agatha Christie's Poirot
 Top Buzzer
 Miss Marple
 Cor, Blimey!
 Two Thousand Acres of Sky
 Rab C. Nesbitt
 Growing Pains
 The Chief
 Perfect Scoundrels
 Traffik
 Macready & Daughter
 Peak Practice
 Pie in the Sky
 Home James
 Never the Twain
 Farrington of the F.O.
 Wings
 All at No 20
 Secret Army
 Capital City
 Dangerfield
 Lovejoy
 EastEnders
 The Bill
 Emmerdale
 Doctors
 Triangle
 Brookside
 Waterfront Beat
 Crossroads
 Hollyoaks (1997, 2002–2003) – Dennis Richardson
 The Sandbaggers (1978)
 Bugs

Films
 Lighthouse Hill
 Decline and Fall
 Fatherland
 The Last Englishman
 Brookdale
 Doomsday Gun
 A Princess in Love
 The Music Lovers
 Waiting for a Killer
 Walking Shadows
 Princess Daisy

References

External links
 
 David McAlister at Theatricalia

1951 births
2015 deaths
English male stage actors
English male television actors
English male voice actors
People from Worthing